Larry Brewster is an American politician serving as a member of the Montana House of Representatives from the 44th district.

Early life and education 
Brewster was born in Idaho Falls, Idaho, and completed vocational training programs at Idaho State University. He served in the United States Army from 1969 to 1972.

Career 
Brewster worked at NorthWestern Corporation from 1982 until his retirement in 2016. He was a member of the Billings Public Schools District Board of Education for six years and was a member of the Billings City Council for eleven years. Brewster was appointed to the Montana House of Representatives and sworn in on March 24, 2020, following the death of Dale Mortensen.

References 

1951 births
21st-century American politicians
Republican Party members of the Montana House of Representatives
Living people
People from Idaho Falls, Idaho
Politicians from Billings, Montana